An institute is a permanent organizational body created for a certain purpose.

Institute or institutes may also refer to:

Places 
 Institute, West Virginia, in the United States
 Institute, Wisconsin, in the United States
 İnstitut, Azerbaijan

Culture and entertainment
The French Institute, a French learned society
Institute, a former alt rock band featuring Gavin Rossdale
Institute F.C., an association football team in Northern Ireland
The Institutes of Justinian, part of the Justinian Code

See also

 Institution (disambiguation)
 Institutiones (disambiguation)
 The Institute (disambiguation)
Mechanics' Institutes, educational establishments